Francisco Dornelles (born January 7, 1935) is a Brazilian lawyer, economist and politician. He was the vice governor of Rio de Janeiro from 2015 to 2019 and was the interim Governor during March and October 2016 after the illness of governor Luiz Fernando Pezão. He represented Rio de Janeiro in the Federal Senate from 2007 to 2015, until he resigned from the post to take office as vice governor. Previously, he served as a deputy from Rio de Janeiro and several positions in presidents José Sarney and Fernando Henrique Cardoso's cabinets from 1987 to 2007. He is a member of the Progressistas.

Dornelles assumed as Acting Governor twice: on March 28, 2016, when Governor Pezão got licensed to treat a lymphoma, and on November 29, 2018, when the Governor was arrested by the Federal Police in a new phase of Operation Car Wash.

References

|-

|-

|-

|-

Living people
1935 births
Governors of Rio de Janeiro (state)
Vice Governors of Rio de Janeiro (state)
20th-century Brazilian lawyers
Brazilian economists
Finance Ministers of Brazil
Members of the Federal Senate (Brazil)
Members of the Chamber of Deputies (Brazil) from Rio de Janeiro (state)
Progressistas politicians
Recipients of the Medal of the Oriental Republic of Uruguay
Federal University of Rio de Janeiro alumni
Harvard University alumni